Chonqeraluy, also rendered as Chunqeraluy or Chownqoralu or Chonqeralu, may refer to:
 Chonqeraluy-e Pol
 Chonqeraluy-e Yekan